Yvonne L. Swan (née Yvonne Wanrow; born 1943) also known as Yvonne Swan Wanrow, is a Sinixt Native American activist, and a once convicted criminal. She is part of the Confederated Tribes of the Colville Reservation. Wanrow is known for the 1972 trial concerning the shooting death of a man who had attempted to molest her son and had attacked other children; she became a cause célèbre of the feminist and American Indian movement. Her case reached the Washington Supreme Court, where its outcome had far-reaching effects on the manner in which juries interpret the behavior of a defendant, the legality of recorded conversations, and considerations for victims of sexual assault.

Early life 
Wanrow was born in 1943 in Inchelium, Washington, a city on the Colville Indian Reservation. In 1962, she graduated from Colville High School. 

After graduation, she was married in 1962 and had two children, a son and a daughter, and the marriage ended in divorce in 1966. After her divorce, she applied to the Bureau of Indian Affairs (BIA) for a grant to study fashion design in San Francisco. She was one of the many American Indians who were encouraged by the Bureau of Indian Affairs to leave their reservations to seek success in America's urban centers at that time, this part of the Bureau's assimilation process known as "relocation". The BIA did not allow her to take her children with her, citing the high cost of child care. 

After completing school, Wanrow had her children join her in San Francisco. Within a month of their arrival, her three-year-old daughter died of encephalitis. Wanrow reconciled with her ex-husband and moved with him and their son to Portland, Oregon. They had another daughter, but the attempted reconciliation did not work out and she left him permanently, taking their two children with her to Washington state. Wanrow settled in Spokane, where the events leading to her to national attention took place.

Spokane, Washington 
Wanrow first moved in with her sister and family, and into a rented home shortly thereafter. She survived by working odd jobs and receiving welfare. Her children were cared for by a neighborhood woman named Shirley Hooper, whose daughter had contracted a sexually transmitted infection some months prior. The child had been unwilling to reveal the identity of her abuser until the night of the shooting. Early in the month of August, Hooper heard a prowler trying to break into her window, and someone tore the screen covering her bedroom window only two days prior to the shooting.

Event on August 11, 1972 
On August 11, 1972, Wanrow's son complained to Hooper that while he was at play in the neighborhood with Hooper's eldest daughter, a man later identified as William Wesler lured them into his house and locked the screen door behind them. The children saw a knife on the counter nearby and fled. Wesler grabbed Wanrow's son and tried to drag him back into the house, but he managed to break free and run to safety. Shortly after the boy made Wesler's actions known, Hooper called the police, who went to her home. The accused arrived at the house, saying, "I didn't touch the kid, I didn't touch the kid."  At that point, Hooper's daughter identified him as the man who had molested her the previous June.  Wesler left the premises, and the police told Hooper they could not arrest him "until Monday morning", after she filed a formal complaint.

Hooper called Wanrow at her home and told her about the altercation and her daughter's identification of the man who had raped her. Wanrow had been home trying to contact someone to repair her car. She pleaded with Hooper to bring all the children by taxi to her home where they would be safe.  Hooper said the police told her the worst thing she could do was to leave her home and instead asked Wanrow if she could borrow her gun for protection.  Concerned about her two children as well as Hooper and her three children, Wanrow took a taxi to Hooper's home. The landlord of the property informed the two mothers that Wesler had attempted to molest another young boy who had previously lived at the same residence, and that he had been committed to the Eastern State Hospital for the mentally ill.  Hooper and the landlord said the police suggested that they "conk him over the head" with a baseball bat should he try to return and another advised them to "wait until he gets in the house".

Late at night after the landlord left, Wanrow and Hooper became frightened, although they had the pistol with them. They invited Wanrow's sister and brother-in-law to the house, who arrived with three of their children. The four adults did not sleep in order to better guard against any possible aggression. At about five o'clock in the morning, unbeknownst to the women in the house, Wanrow's brother-in-law went to Wesler's residence and accused him of pedophilia. Wesler was intoxicated, and he and an associate were persuaded to return to the Hooper home to reconcile their differences. As Wesler attempted to enter the residence, Hooper yelled at him to get out of there, causing some commotion.  Wanrow's three-year-old nephew awoke and began crying, prompting Wesler, who had by this time entered the home, to state, "My, what a cute little boy". Wesler made a move for the child, which upset his mother, Wanrow's sister. An emotional situation developed during which Wanrow drew her pistol and shot and killed Wesler. His associate was also hit, but he survived and fled. Hooper called Crime Check (emergency phone number, similar to 911), and the call was recorded. During the conversation, the telephone was passed to Wanrow, who confessed to the killing and expressed a distrust of the police. Although she was upset, Wanrow was not screaming. The stereotype of a "hysterical woman" was used against her by the prosecution to persuade the jury that she was calm. This recording was to play prominently in her conviction and in its subsequent overturn.

The trial 
Unable to convince her public defenders to fight for her, Wanrow initially pleaded guilty. Later, following the counsel of a new attorney, she changed her plea to not guilty by reason of temporary insanity and self-defense. The prosecution alleged that Wanrow was not in any danger and that she took the law into her own hands. This argument relied on ethnic stereotypes the jury would have been familiar with from the media, and the verdict may have been influenced by militant actions by the American Indian Movement (AIM), which was covered in a negative light in Spokane. In 1973, Wanrow was convicted of second-degree murder and first-degree assault. Defense attorney Eugene I. Annis appealed the ruling on eleven counts of judicial error. 

In 1975, the appeals court reversed the conviction and ordered a retrial. They found that:
 the jury was not sequestered and an article of Wanrow's earlier guilty plea appeared in the evening paper. When Wanrow's defense moved for a retrial, it was denied after the jury was questioned as a group whether they saw the newspaper and they said no,
 the recorded confession was used as evidence in violation of the law,
 the judge's use of masculine pronouns while reading the law and instructing jurors predisposed them to an interpretation of the law that did not account for the necessity of weaponry in inter-gender conflicts, especially considering the fact that Wanrow was handicapped by a broken leg, a cast, and crutches at the time,
 the presiding judge had not allowed expert testimony that would have provided necessary cultural background on the Colville Indian culture, and,
 the judge did not read jurors a recently enacted law that dictated that they not interpret self-defense murder cases on the basis of whether the defender was actually in danger of his or her life, but only whether they believed themselves to be in danger.

In 1976, the prosecutors in the case, Donald Brockett and Fred Caruso, petitioned the Washington Supreme Court against the ruling, but it was upheld in 1977. During the Supreme Court appeal, Wanrow was represented by attorneys Elizabeth Schneider of New York's Center for Constitutional Rights, Susan B. Jordan of San Francisco, and Mary Alice Theiler from Seattle. The case was remanded back to Spokane Superior Court for retrial.  Prior to the scheduled 1979 trial, the prosecution offered a plea bargain—if Wanrow pleaded to manslaughter and second-degree assault, they would drop the weapons charge (which carried a mandatory five-year prison sentence) and they would not recommend prison.  After lengthy discussions with her attorneys, which also included William Kunstler, Wanrow learned that self-defense was included in manslaughter, and she agreed to plea to the reduced charges.  On April 26, 1979 following an all-day mitigation hearing, Judge Harold Clark sentenced her to the maximum 30 years and suspended all but five years, which she was to serve on  probation.  In lieu of one-year jail time, he ordered 2,000 hours of community service, which she served by counseling alcoholics and teaching culture to Indian students on her home reservation.

Results 
The January 7, 1977 Supreme Court ruling in State of Washington v. Wanrow was an important victory for the feminist cause of gender-equality before the law. In a landmark ruling, the Washington Supreme Court, sitting en banc, declared that Yvonne Wanrow was entitled to have a jury consider her actions in the light of her "perceptions of the situation, including those perceptions which were the product of our nation's long and unfortunate history of sex discrimination." The ruling was the first in America recognizing the particular legal problems of women who defend themselves or their children from male attackers, and was again affirmed by the Washington Supreme Court in denying the prosecutor's petition for rehearing in 1979. Before the Wanrow decision, standard jury instructions asked what a "reasonably prudent man" would have done, even if the accused was a woman; the Wanrow decision set a precedent that when a woman is tried in a criminal trial the juries should ask "what a reasonably prudent woman similarly situated would have done."

Wanrow was an active speaker for the women's movement, which raised funds on her behalf. The American Indian Movement helped Wanrow, too, and took advantage of the opportunity to highlight unequal treatment of Native Americans by the criminal justice system.  Ellen Earth, a spokesperson of the Yvonne Wanrow Defense Committee, is quoted as saying that the committee wanted to "make the trial last as long as possible" in order to reeducate "the jury about Indians".  Wanrow stated, "The trial would not have taken place had I been an affluent white woman who killed an American Indian.  Instead, after one week, I was convicted by an all-white jury on May 13, 1973 (Mother's Day) for killing a known child molester.  I had heard about Wesler's background as a sex offender the night before the shooting, but was not allowed to bring up the information at trial.  The police tape played a role in bringing about the conviction — the jury was allowed to hear it two times."

In addition, according to authors on the subject who quote Wanrow herself, the crime was an epiphany in the defendant's life.  As a result of her non-survival in mainstream American society, she experienced cognitive dissonance and poverty. Her killing of Wesler served to awaken her to her traditionally ascribed gender role, that of a mother devoted entirely to her children.  She also found solace in her culture's spirituality and philosophy, which advocated a lifestyle that was family-oriented and harmonious with nature.  As a result, she returned to her reservation, where she worked for the improvement of the community and opposed mining to protect the environment.  She also became involved in later cases involving murder charges against Indian women, and, in 1993 was the International Indian Treaty Councils (IITC) political prisoners coordinator, when she advocated the case of Norma Jean Croy.

See also 
 Battered woman syndrome
 Inez Garcia
 Joan Little

References

External links 
 Information from the Center for Constitutional Rights
 A lengthy explanation of the trial and the appeals, with quotes from the trial transcript
  International Indian Treaty Council

1943 births
American people convicted of manslaughter
American feminists
20th-century Native Americans
Living people
Native American feminists
20th-century Native American women
Sinixt
Native American activists
Vigilantism against sex offenders